Murder Squad Nationwide is an album by American rap group South Central Cartel and friends. It was released February 14, 1995 on South Central Cartel's G.W.K. Records and distributed by Def Jam Recordings. The album features production by Ant Banks, DJ Gripp, G$ Money and Prodeje. It peaked at number 12 on the Billboard Top R&B/Hip-Hop Albums, at number 1 on the Billboard Top Heatseekers and at number 106 on the Billboard 200. The album features performances by Spice 1, Ant Banks, Ice-T, Treach, 187 Fac, Mr. Wesside, Hot Dolla and Big Mike.

Knock on Wood
There are two different versions of the song, "Knock on Wood", the album version and the remixed version. The album version of "Knock on Wood" features performances by Sh'Killa, Gripsta and South Central Cartel.

A remixed single and music video were also released for the song. Both versions of the song were produced by Prodeje and feature the same verses by Sh'Killa and Gripsta and the same chorus sung by L.V. The remixed version of "Knock on Wood" replaces the South Central Cartel members verses with verses by The Evil Side G's, B.G. Knocc Out & Dresta and Jayo Felony. The remixed version of the song does not appear on the album.

Track listing

Chart history

References

External links

1995 albums
South Central Cartel albums
Albums produced by Prodeje
Albums produced by Ant Banks
Def Jam Recordings albums